Ogborn is an unincorporated community in St. Francois County, in the U.S. state of Missouri.

Ogborn has the name of a railroad employee.  A variant name was "Farmington Junction".

References

Unincorporated communities in St. Francois  County, Missouri
Unincorporated communities in Missouri